Godinez v. Moran, 509 U.S. 389 (1993), was a landmark decision in which the U.S. Supreme Court ruled that if a defendant was competent to stand trial, they were automatically competent to plead guilty, and thereby waive the panoply of trial rights, including the right to counsel.

Circumstances
On August 2, 1984, Richard Allen Moran entered the Red Pearl Saloon in Carson City, Nevada and shot the bartender and a customer before robbing the cash register. Nine days later he shot his ex-wife and then himself, and also unsuccessfully tried to slit his wrists. On August 13 Moran summoned the police to his hospital bedside and confessed to the killings.

He was charged with three counts of first-degree murder, but pleaded not guilty. Two court-ordered psychiatrists concluded that he was competent to stand trial, although both noted he was depressed.

The prosecution sought the death penalty. Two months after the psychiatric evaluations,  Moran stated to the court that he wished to discharge his attorneys and change his plea to guilty. He also waived his right to counsel. After his trial he was sentenced to death. Moran then sought state post conviction relief on the grounds that he was mentally incompetent to represent himself. The trial court held an evidentiary hearing and then it rejected his claim.

Appeals
Moran's appeal to the Nevada Supreme Court was dismissed and a Federal District Court denied his petition for a writ of habeas corpus. However, the Court of Appeals reversed this decision, concluding that due process required the trial court to hold a hearing to "evaluate and determine" Moran's competency before accepting his decisions to waive counsel and plead guilty. It also held that the trial court erred by using the wrong legal standard. It stated that competency to waive constitutional rights requires a higher level of mental functioning than the level of mental functioning required to stand trial. They reasoned that competence to stand trial requires only that the defendant have a rational and factual understanding of the proceedings and is capable of assisting his counsel, while competence to waive counsel or plead guilty requires that the defendant has the capacity for reasoned choice among those choices available.

Moran petitioned the Supreme Court on a writ of certiorari.

Decision
In a split decision (7–2), the Court found that competency to stand trial and competency to plead guilty were equivalent competencies. In other words, if a person was found competent for one, the person was automatically competent for the second. Further, the court held that a person who is competent to stand trial is also competent to waive an attorney and proceed pro se. The court held that it was irrelevant if the individual represented himself inadequately. (The Court later held in Indiana v. Edwards that the competency to stand trial was different from the competency to have self-representation.)

As Justice Kennedy stated in his concurring opinion: "At common law, therefore, no attempt was made to apply different competency standards to different stages of criminal proceedings or to the variety of decisions that a defendant must make during the course of those proceedings." Further, the Due Process Clause "does not mandate different standards of competency at various stages of or for different decisions made during the criminal proceedings."

Significance
The court appears to be moving toward a single standard of competency to be applied throughout criminal proceedings. The court finds nothing in case law to the contrary. "[S]etting out varying competency standards for each decision and stage of a criminal proceeding would disrupt the orderly course of trial and, from the standpoint of all parties, prove unworkable both at trial and on appellate review."
 
As Justice Kennedy notes, this holding in Godinez v. Moran may seem harsh in equating all competencies as essentially equal. However, there are limitations noted in a careful reading of the decision. One is that the Court emphasized that competence to waive legal counsel alone does not make a waiver of counsel valid. The trial judge must determine if the waiver is "voluntary" and "intelligent".

Further, in a decision, McKaskle v. Wiggins (1984), the Court held that even if the defendant successfully waives counsel, the court can provide a "standby counsel" if the pro se defendant has actual control over the presentation of the case to the jury, and the jury retains the belief the defendant is in charge of his own case.

Implications for evaluation
Following this decision, a forensic clinician conducting a competency evaluation for  competency to stand trial, should also include an evaluation of competency to waive counsel.

Subsequent developments
Moran was executed by lethal injection on March 30, 1996.

See also
 List of United States Supreme Court cases, volume 509
 List of United States Supreme Court cases
 Lists of United States Supreme Court cases by volume
 List of United States Supreme Court cases by the Rehnquist Court
 Competency evaluation
 List of criminal competencies
 Indiana v. Edwards
General:
 Capital punishment in Nevada
 Capital punishment in the United States
 List of people executed in Nevada

Footnotes

Further reading

External links

Competency to Stand Trial

United States Supreme Court cases
United States Supreme Court cases of the Rehnquist Court
1993 in United States case law
Adjudicative competence case law